is a district located in Tokachi Subprefecture, Hokkaido, Japan.

As of 2004, the district has an estimated population of 6,342 and a density of 8.69 persons per km2. The total area is 729.64 km2.

Towns
Urahoro

History
April 1, 1906: Part of Tōbui Village in the former Tōbui District incorporated into Ōtsu Village. Part of Tabikorai Village, Nakagawa District was also incorporated into Ōtsu Village.
April 1, 1955: Ōtsu Village split up among Taiki Town, Hiroo District, Toyokoro Village (now Town), Nakagawa District, and Urahoro.

Districts in Hokkaido